Racata is a genus of Southeast Asian sheet weavers that was first described by Alfred Frank Millidge in 1995.

Species
 it contains four species, found in Asia:
Racata brevis Tanasevitch, 2019 – Indonesia (Sumatra)
Racata grata Millidge, 1995 (type) – Indonesia (Krakatau, Java, Belitung)
Racata laxa Tanasevitch, 2019 – Thailand, Indonesia (Sumatra)
Racata sumatera Tanasevitch, 2019 – Indonesia (Sumatra)

See also
 List of Linyphiidae species (Q–Z)

References

Araneomorphae genera
Linyphiidae
Spiders of Asia